Nicholas la Cava (born October 24, 1986) is an American rower. He competed in the Men's lightweight coxless four event at the 2012 Summer Olympics.

La Cava attended Phillips Exeter Academy graduated from Columbia University in 2009. He co-founded Chocomize, an online custom chocolate company with two friends from college, Eric Heinbockel and Fabian Kaempfer.

References

External links
 

1986 births
Living people
American male rowers
Olympic rowers of the United States
Rowers at the 2012 Summer Olympics
People from Weston, Connecticut
Sportspeople from Connecticut
Columbia Lions rowers
Businesspeople from Connecticut
Phillips Exeter Academy alumni